Fire: The Jimi Hendrix Collection is a posthumous compilation album by American rock musician Jimi Hendrix. Released on June 7, 2010, the album features 20 songs from throughout the career of the Jimi Hendrix Experience and Hendrix as a solo musician, including "Valleys of Neptune", only officially released on the album of the same name in March 2010. Released by CMG, the album is named after the Experience song "Fire", originally released on the band's debut album Are You Experienced in 1967.

Track listing

References

2010 compilation albums
Jimi Hendrix compilation albums
Albums produced by Chas Chandler
Albums produced by Eddie Kramer